Namsskogan is the administrative centre of Namsskogan municipality in Trøndelag county, Norway. The village is located in the Namdalen valley on an island in the middle of the river Namsen, although it also includes land on both sides of the river. The European route E06 highway and the Nordlandsbanen railway line both run through the village, with the train stopping at Namsskogan Station.

Name
The name of the village (and municipality) was created in 1923. The first element is the name of the river Namsen and the last element is the plural form of skog which means "woods".  Therefore, the meaning of the name is "the woodlands around Namsen".

References

Villages in Trøndelag
Namsskogan